Events from the year 1979 in Jordan.

Incumbents
Monarch: Hussein 
Prime Minister: Mudar Badran (until 19 December), Abdelhamid Sharaf (starting 19 December)

Events

Births

21 June - Fadi Shaheen.

See also

 Years in Iraq
 Years in Syria
 Years in Saudi Arabia

References

 
1970s in Jordan
Jordan
Jordan
Years of the 20th century in Jordan